Deuterated benzene (C6D6) is an isotopologue of benzene (C6H6) in which the hydrogen atom ("H") is replaced with deuterium (heavy hydrogen) isotope ("D").

Properties
The properties of deuterated benzene are very similar to those of normal benzene, however, the increased atomic weight of deuterium relative to protium means that the melting point of C6D6 is about 1.3 °C higher than that of the nondeuterated analogue. The boiling points of both compounds, however, are the same: 80 °C.

Applications
Deuterated benzene is a common solvent used in NMR spectroscopy. It is widely used for taking spectra of organometallic compounds, which often react with the cheaper deuterated chloroform.

A slightly more exotic application of C6D6 is in the synthesis of molecules containing a deuterated phenyl group. Deuterated benzene will undergo all the same reactions its normal analogue will, just a little more slowly due to the kinetic isotope effect. For example, deuterated benzene could be used in the synthesis of deuterated benzoic acid, if desired:

Many simple monosubstituted aromatic compounds bearing the deuterated phenyl (C6D5) group may be purchased commercially, such as aniline, acetophenone, nitrobenzene, bromobenzene, and more.

References

Deuterated solvents
Benzene